Leandah was a German girl group, created on the eleventh installment of the television show Popstars in 2015. The group comprised singers Patricia Ekkert, Alena Fischer, Selina Frimpong-Ansah, and Sabrina Kolip. Their debut single, "Tage wie Juwelen", was released on 10 October 2015 to minor commercial success. The quartet announced their disbandment in February 2016.

Discography

Singles

References

External links
  

German girl groups
German pop music groups
Musical groups established in 2015
Musical quartets
Popstars winners
2015 establishments in Germany